The 1979 UEFA Cup Final was played on 9 May 1979, and 23 May 1979, between Red Star Belgrade of SFR Yugoslavia and Borussia Mönchengladbach of West Germany. Mönchengladbach won 2–1 on aggregate.

Route to the final

Match details

First leg

Second leg

See also
1978–79 UEFA Cup
Red Star Belgrade in European football

References
RSSSF
UEFA

2
Red Star Belgrade matches
Borussia Mönchengladbach matches
1979
1979
1979
1978–79 in German football
1978–79 in Yugoslav football
1979 in West German sport
May 1979 sports events in Europe
1970s in Belgrade
1979 in Serbia
Football in Belgrade
International sports competitions in Belgrade
1970s in Düsseldorf
Sports competitions in Düsseldorf